The Christian Cynosure was a newspaper in existence from 1868 to 1983.  Published in Chicago by the National Christian Association of Jonathan Blanchard, it was devoted to opposing secret societies such as the Freemasons and The Grange, featuring "emotional tirades and exposés which explained to God's servants why they should not belong to any secret organizations".

Notes

External links
 Archive (1868 to 1923)

Publications established in 1868
Publications disestablished in 1983
1868 establishments in Illinois
1983 disestablishments in Illinois
Defunct newspapers published in Chicago
Anti-Masonry